An incomplete list of events which occurred in Italy in 1693:

 January 11 Sicily earthquake occurs
 The secret society Knights of the Apocalypse established

Births
 Placido Campolo poet (died 1743)

Deaths
 Count Carlo Cesare Malvasia, scholar and art historian (born 1616)

References